Douglas Garcia Bispo dos Santos (born in São Paulo on January 26, 1994) is a Brazilian former state deputy in São Paulo. He is affiliated with the Republicans. He was elected in 2018.
He is anti-communist and an ally of conservative president Jair Bolsonaro.

In the 2022 election, he obtained just over 24,000 votes and was not elected federal deputy, being without holding a public office as soon as his term ends in March 2023.

Personal life
On April 5, 2019, the day after threatening to assault a transsexual who used the same bathroom as her mother or sister, Garcia admitted to being homosexual. On the tribune of the Legislative Assembly of São Paulo (ALESP), he stated: "It does not diminish in any way the flags that I have been defending here in the Legislative Assembly against 'gender ideology'".

References

External links 
 
 

Living people
1994 births
Brazilian anti-communists
21st-century Brazilian politicians
Gay politicians
Republicans (Brazil) politicians
Members of the Chamber of Deputies (Brazil) from São Paulo